Argyrolagus is an extinct genus of South American metatherian, belonging to the order Polydolopimorpha from the Early Pliocene Monte Hermoso Formation, Patagonia, Argentina.

Description 
It had a long tail for balance, and a narrow head with a pointed snout. Judging from its huge eyes, Argyrolagus was nocturnal. The form of its teeth suggest that it would have fed on desert plants.

See also 

 Chulpasia

References 

Prehistoric marsupial genera
Pliocene marsupials
Zanclean extinctions
Pliocene mammals of South America
Chapadmalalan
Montehermosan
Neogene Argentina
Fossils of Argentina
Fossil taxa described in 1904
Taxa named by Florentino Ameghino